The Lourinhã Formation is a fossil rich geological formation in western Portugal, named for the municipality of Lourinhã. The formation is mostly Late Jurassic in age (Kimmeridgian/Tithonian), with the top of the formation extending into the earliest Cretaceous (Berriasian). It is notable for containing a fauna especially similar to that of the Morrison Formation in the United States and a lesser extent to the Tendaguru Formation in Tanzania. There are also similarities to the nearby Villar del Arzobispo Formation. The stratigraphy of the formation and the basin in general is complex and controversial, with the constituent member beds belonging to the formation varying between different authors.

Besides the fossil bones, Lourinhã Formation is well known for the fossil tracks and fossilized dinosaur eggs.

The Lourinhã Formation includes several lithostratigraphic units, such as Praia da Amoreira-Porto Novo Members and Praia Azul Member and the Assenta Member.

Lithology and depositional history

Depositional history 

The Lourinhã Formation is located within the Lusitanian Basin, a mostly onshore North South orientated rift basin within western Portugal, formed during the Opening of the North Atlantic Ocean, with sediment deposition beginning during the Late Triassic-Early Jurassic. It primarily consists of syn-rift near-coastal continental siliciclastic sediments, with several marine intercalations. The primary flow direction was North to South, originating from Galicia and flowing between the Iberian landmass to the east and the now largely submerged Berlengas horst, a north–south oriented ridge, to the west.

Stratigraphy 
The unit was first formally proposed by Hill in 1988.

The stratigraphy of the Lourinhã Formation is complex and varies between sub-basins with several competing stratigraphic proposals and there is currently no consensus on the matter, one of the most recent stratigraphies, divides the formation into three members which are from oldest to youngest the Praia da Amoreira-Porto Novo Member, Praia Azul Member, and the Assenta Member.

Praia da Amoreira-Porto Novo Member 
The Praia da Amoreira-Porto Novo Member is composed of the Priaia de Amoreira Member, which consists of massive mudrock-sand with metre thick sandstone lenses, with massive mudrock with calcrete. The overlying Poto Novo Mb. consists of massive bodies of sandstone, often cross bedded. The environment of deposition is interpreted as a meandering fluvial system, while the Porto Novo Mb is interpreted as a deltaic deposit. It is interpreted to be latest Kimmeridgian in age, and overlies the Consolacao Unit at the top of the Aulacostephanus eudoxus ammonite zone.

Praia Azul Member 
The Praia Azul Member, formerly known as the Sobral unit/member is 80 to 130 metres thick and consists of tabular marls and mudstones, with rare sandstones bodies. There are three distinct laterally extensive (>20 km) thin shelly carbonate horizons within this member, indicating brief marine transgressions. South of Santa Cruz primarily consists of sandstone with rare conglomerate. The age is considered to be latest Kimmeridgian to earliest Tithonian, correlated to the ammonite zones of Hybonoticeras beckeri and Hybonoticeras hybonotum.

Assenta Member 
The Assenta Member is around 300 metres thick and predominantly consists of mudstones with frequent layers of caliche. Near the top of the member several layers of tens of metres thick nodular and marly bioclastic limestones are present, containing marine benthic forams, the nodularity is derived from intense Thalassinoides burrowing. It is predominately late Tithonian in age, with the last few metres probably being earliest Berriasian, with the top of the formation roughly correlative with the base of the magnetochron M18n. (~144.7 Ma) The environment of deposition is interpreted as being an upper fluvial-dominated delta to meandering fluvial systems flowing on a paralic plain.

Dinosaurs of the Lourinhã Formation 
In a 2003 study, an analysis of all Portuguese dinosaurs was published. The study created a cladogram showing the possible relations of all Portuguese dinosaurs, including those at the time known from the Lourinhã Formation.

Saurischia

Theropods

Sauropods 
{| class="wikitable" align="center"
|- 
! Genus
! Species
! Member
! Material
! Notes
! Images
|-
|style="background:#f3e9f3;" | 
Dinheirosaurus
|style="background:#f3e9f3;" | 
D. lourinhanensis
|style="background:#f3e9f3;" | 
Amoreira-Porta Novo Member
|style="background:#f3e9f3;" | 
One specimen. Vertebrae; potentially other parts of the body.
|style="background:#f3e9f3;" | 
Junior synonym of Supersaurus.
|style="background:#f3e9f3;" | 
|-
|
Diplodocidae indet.
|
Intermediate
|
|
One Dorsal Vertebra
|
Regarded by Mannion et al. (2012) as being unique from Dinheirosaurus and possibly indicating another diplodocid in the formation, but being non-diagnostic it doesn't warrant description.
|
|-
|
Lourinhasaurus
|
L. alenquerensis
|Praia Azul Member
|A partial postcranial skeleton.
|Possibly a Camarasaurid Macronarian.
|
|-
|
Lusotitan
|
L. atalaiensis
|Praia Azul Member
|
Fragmentary material.
|
A large brachiosaur, a close relative of Brachiosaurus proper.
|

|-
|Oceanotitan
|O. dantasi
|Praia da Amoreira-Porta Novo Member
|scapula, almost all of the pelvis, a complete leg sans the toes, and nine caudals.
|A titanosauriform
|
|-
|
Supersaurus
| S. lourinhanensis
| Praia da Amoreira-Porta Novo Member
| One specimen. Vertebrae; potentially other parts of the body.
| Previously Dinheirosaurus. Tschopp et al. (2015) sunk the genus into Supersaurus.
| 
|-
| Zby| Z. atlanticus| Amoreira-Porto Novo Member
| Holotype: Tooth, cervical neutral arch, forelimb, various other fragments.
| No described close relatives from the Morrison Formation or Tendaguru beds; instead allied to other European taxa. Note however teeth from the Tendaguru beds might belong to Turiasauria, as Zby.
| 
|-
|}

 Ornithischia 

 Thyreophorans 

 Ornithopods 

additionally remains belonging to a dryosaurid and ankylopollexian unreferrable to either Eousdryosaurus or Draconyx have been found, the ankylopollexian possessed a 44cm scapula.

 Synapsids of the Lourinhã Formation 

 Docodonta 

 Dryolestoidea 

 Flora 

 Correlation 

 See also 
 Camadas de Alcobaça
 Camadas de Guimarota
 List of fossil sites
 Museu da Lourinhã
 List of dinosaur bearing rock formations

 References 

 Bibliography 
 Antunes, M.T. and Mateus, O. (2003). Dinosaurs of Portugal. C. R. Palevol, 2:77–95
 Mateus, O. (2006). "Late Jurassic dinosaurs from the Morrison Formation, the Lourinhã and Alcobaça Formations (Portugal), and the Tendaguru Beds (Tanzania): a comparison," in Foster, J.R. and Lucas, S. G. R.M., eds., 2006, "Paleontology and Geology of the Upper Jurassic Morrison Formation." New Mexico Museum of Natural History and Science Bulletin'' 36

External links 
 Antunes & Mateus (2003)
 Mateus (2006)

 
Geologic formations of Portugal
Jurassic System of Europe
Sandstone formations
Mudstone formations
Conglomerate formations